The 2020 Bowling Green Falcons football team represented Bowling Green State University during the 2020 NCAA Division I FBS football season. The Falcons were led by second-year head coach Scot Loeffler and played their home games at Doyt Perry Stadium in Bowling Green, Ohio. They competed as members of the East Division of the Mid-American Conference (MAC). They finished the season 0–5 in their conference-only schedule to finish in last place in the East division.

Previous season
The Falcons finished the 2019 season 3–9, 2–6 in MAC play to finish in fifth place in the East division.

COVID-19 effects on season
On August 8, 2020, the MAC announced that it was postponing the 2020 football season due to the ongoing COVID-19 pandemic. The conference announced it would explore playing a season in the Spring of 2021. It was the first major football conference to announce the postponement of the season.

On September 25, the conference voted to reinstate the football season beginning on November 4. The conference was the last major conference to reinstate football.

Schedule
Bowling Green had games scheduled against Illinois and Ohio State which were canceled due to the COVID-19 pandemic. The final regularly-scheduled game of the season against Miami was canceled due to COVID-19 issues at Miami.

References

Bowling Green
Bowling Green Falcons football seasons
College football winless seasons
Bowling Green Falcons football